Jarzé-Villages is a commune in the Maine-et-Loire department of western France. The municipality was established on 1 January 2016 and consists of the former communes of Jarzé, Beauvau, Chaumont-d'Anjou and Lué-en-Baugeois.

See also 
Communes of the Maine-et-Loire department

References 

Communes of Maine-et-Loire
States and territories established in 2016